Cislago is a  (municipality) in the Province of Varese in the Italian region of Lombardy, located about  northwest of Milan and about  southeast of Varese.

Cislago borders the municipalities of Gerenzano, Gorla Minore, Limido Comasco, Mozzate, Rescaldina, Turate.

Demographic evolution

References

External links
 www.comunedicislago.it

Cities and towns in Lombardy